List of presidents of the Senate of Burundi, who is the presiding officer in the Senate of Burundi. The President is elected by the members of the Senate for a five-year term.

Below is a list of office-holders:

References

Politics of Burundi
Burundi, Senate
 
Lists of Burundian people by occupation